Jennifer Clare Louise Wallace (born 20 December 1980) is an Australian cricketer. She has played for the New South Wales Breakers, Western Fury, Perth Scorchers, and Somerset Women.

Wallace was born in Sydney and moved to Perth in 2007.

References

External links
 

Living people
1980 births
Sportswomen from New South Wales
Cricketers from Sydney
New South Wales Breakers cricketers
Western Australia women cricketers
Perth Scorchers (WBBL) cricketers
Somerset women cricketers